Reggie Brown may refer to:
Reggie Brown (American football coach) (1876–1961), American college football coach at Boston University from 1926–1929
Reginald J. Brown (1940–2005), U.S. Assistant Secretary of the Army (Manpower and Reserve Affairs)
Reggie Brown (fullback) (born 1973), American football player
Reggie Brown (impersonator) (born 1980), comedic impersonator known for Barack Obama impersonations
Reggie Brown (linebacker) (born 1974), American football player
Reggie Brown (wide receiver) (born 1981), American football player
Reggie Brown (running back) (born 1960), American football player
Reggie Brown (Snapchat), internet entrepreneur who co-founded Snapchat

See also 
Reginald Browne (disambiguation)